Howard Emslie (22 August 1922 – 1 May 1985) was a South African cricketer. He played in twenty-eight first-class matches for Eastern Province from 1946/47 to 1956/57.

See also
 List of Eastern Province representative cricketers

References

External links
 

1922 births
1985 deaths
South African cricketers
Eastern Province cricketers
People from Makhanda, Eastern Cape
Cricketers from the Eastern Cape